Loose Ends (also known as Loose End) are a British R&B band that had several hit records throughout the 1980s and into the 1990s. The trio was formed in London in 1980, initially comprising vocalist and guitarist Carl McIntosh, vocalist Jane Eugene, and keyboard player Steve Nichol. 

Despite having seen success throughout the 1980s, both Nichol and Eugene left the group in 1989, bringing an end to the band's most successful phase.

Career
Loose Ends signed with Virgin Records in 1981 under the name 'Loose End'. Some of their debut material was written for them by Chris Amoo and Eddie Amoo, who had achieved UK Singles Chart success of their own in the 1970s, with their group The Real Thing. The trio changed its name to Loose Ends in 1983 and continued to record for Virgin. They were distributed in the U.S. by MCA Records.

The group was founded by Steve Nichol after he left the London Guildhall School of Music and Drama. Nichol went on to tour with The Jam in 1982 as a trumpet, trombone and keyboard player. Together the trio achieved their first success with "Hangin' on a String (Contemplating)" in 1985, which reached No. 13 in the British chart. "Hangin' on a String" also reached No. 1 on the US Billboard R&B chart, making Loose Ends the first African-British band ever to top that chart. They reached No. 16 with the single "Magic Touch" in the same year. The disc was produced in the US, as was their 1986 hit "Slow Down" (later used as the theme music for Canadian MuchMusic's Soul in the City program). At this time, Carl McIntosh also arranged and played on a number of tracks from Five Star's debut album including the single "Let Me Be The One" which reached number two in the same listings later in 1986. Subsequent falling sales saw the threesome notch up their final transatlantic hit in 1988 with "Watching You (Watching Me)."

The group's line-up changed in 1990 due to differences in its proposed musical direction. Eugene and Nichol decided to leave, and were replaced by Linda Carriere and Sunay Suleyman. Look How Long turned out to be the final studio album released under the Loose Ends name, and featured their final hit single, "Don't Be a Fool" (1990). McIntosh himself went on to work behind the recording desk with the new members and has continued to do that to date. He has since produced several artists' work, most notably that of Caron Wheeler, Ruth Joy and Kwesi.

2015–present
During the year of 2015, McIntosh was interviewed by Daniel Falconer of the celebrity magazine Female First to speak about his top 10 career moments. Also in the same year, he participated in a charity fundraising event in Glasgow, Scotland in aid of supporting Gambia. In 2016, leading Toronto newspaper Now interviewed McIntosh on how he was seen as being responsible for introducing Toronto to UK soul music in the 1980s and 1990s. In 2017, McIntosh was asked by Red Bull Music Academy in the Australian city of Melbourne, to speak about how he previously produced Loose Ends' songs. During 2020, Smooth Radio presenter Angie Greaves interviewed McIntosh on how he continued with Loose Ends without the former members explaining how the group did not break up when two members left.

Soon after, McIntosh was asked by Roland Corporation music to discuss and demonstrate how he produced the drum programming using the legendary Roland TR-808 drum machine for the hit song "Hangin' on a String (Contemplating)". McIntosh went into great detail explaining how it was produced.

McIntosh continues to perform, writing new songs under the name Loose Ends with the line-up from 1990, Linda Carriere and Sunay Suleyman. In 2021, Loose Ends signed a new record deal with the British hip hop label Digital Jukebox Records to release new singles and albums.

Discography

Studio albums

Compilation albums

Singles

References

External links
 

Musical groups established in 1980
British contemporary R&B musical groups
Musical groups from London
Virgin Records artists
MCA Records artists
Black British musical groups
British soul musical groups
British post-disco music groups